Bahne Rabe (7 August 1963 – 5 August 2001) was a competition rower from West Germany. He won two Olympic medals in the coxed eight event: a gold in 1988 and a bronze in 1992, and in 1991 he won a world title in the coxed fours.

After retiring in 1995, Rabe had difficulties in maintaining his daily balance. He became anorexic, losing about 40 kg by 2001. He died of pneumonia on 5 August 2001, after having been admitted to hospital in critical condition due to extreme malnutrition.

References

External links
 
 
 

1963 births
2001 deaths
People from Lüneburg
West German male rowers
German male rowers
Olympic rowers of West Germany
Olympic rowers of Germany
Olympic gold medalists for West Germany
Olympic bronze medalists for Germany
Olympic medalists in rowing
Rowers at the 1988 Summer Olympics
Rowers at the 1992 Summer Olympics
Medalists at the 1988 Summer Olympics
Medalists at the 1992 Summer Olympics
World Rowing Championships medalists for Germany
Sportspeople from Lower Saxony
20th-century German people